William David Young (born 1956) is an American retired law enforcement officer and the 15th Sheriff of Clark County from January 6, 2003 to January 2, 2007. He is a member of the Republican Party.

History
On May 4, 2005, Young supported a tax increase in Clark County for new officers.

On March 14, 2007, Young was hired by Station Casinos.

On September 6, 2013, Young declined to run for a second term as Clark County Sheriff in 2014.

On August 16, 2016, Young and former Democratic Washoe County Sheriff Mike Haley endorsed Nevada Question 1 ballot.

References

1956 births
Living people
Bishop Gorman High School alumni
Nevada Republicans
Nevada sheriffs
People from Yerington, Nevada
Politicians from Las Vegas
University of Louisville alumni
University of Nevada, Las Vegas alumni